Kondom Agaundo, M.L.C. is a 1962 Australian documentary about indigenous leader Kondom Agaundo, from the Central Highlands of Papua New Guinea, who became a member of the Legislative Council with no formal education.

References

External links

1962 films
1960s short documentary films
Films directed by Lee Robinson
Australian short documentary films
Australian political films
1960s political films
1960s English-language films